Eckhard Dagge (February 27, 1948 in Probsteierhagen, Germany – April 4, 2006 in Hamburg), was a professional boxer in the super welterweight (154 lb) division.

Eckhard Dagge was Germany's second world champion, after Max Schmeling, holding the World Boxing Council Light Middleweight title from 1976 to 1977. Dagge also held German National and European titles, during his ten-year career.

Background 
Dagge was born in Probsteierhagen, Germany, near Kiel in 1946. He learned to fight in the bars and taverns of Hamburg. He would later embark on an amateur career, in which he won 66 out of 80 bouts, before falling short of making the 1972 Olympic Team.

Professional career 
Dagge would win the German Middleweight title, in his 6th bout. Dagge would follow up with wins over notable, but faded fighters Denny Moyer and Manuel González. In 1974, Dagge challenged Jose Manuel Duran for the European Light Middleweight title, losing by 11th-round TKO. He came back the next year however, and stopped Duran in the 9th round, to win the title. He would defend this title once, before he lost it by decision to Vito Antuofermo.

Dagge earned a title shot against WBC Light Middleweight champion Elisha Obed on June 17, 1976. Dagge pulled off a stunning upset of Obed, winning by 10th-round TKO, to win the title in Berlin. Dagge was scheduled to defend his title against Sugar Ray Seales. However Seales pulled out a of the fight and former champion Emile Griffith stepped in as a replacement. The result was Dagge winning a controversial majority decision. He followed this up with a draw over England's Maurice Hope, a future world champion. Dagge then faced Australia-based Italian Rocky Mattioli on August 6, 1977, and was knocked out in the 5th round. Dagge would win six more bouts over lesser opposition until he was stopped by Brian Anderson in 1981.

Professional boxing record

Life after boxing
Dagge had a reputation as a wild man during his career and afterwards, as he struggled with alcoholism. Dagge worked with Universum after his pro career ended, training Dariusz Michalczewski, Michael Loewe, and Mario Schiesser. However, he was fired from his job as a manager in 1994, due to absenteeism and his problems with alcoholism. Dagge died on April 4, 2006 in Hamburg, Germany, after a battle with cancer.

See also
List of world light-middleweight boxing champions

References

External links

 

1948 births
2006 deaths
German male boxers
Sportspeople from Schleswig-Holstein
European Boxing Union champions
World Boxing Council champions
Middleweight boxers
World light-middleweight boxing champions